Ondříček (feminine Ondříčková) is a Czech surname. Notable people include:

 David Ondříček, Czech film director
 František Ondříček, Czech violinist and composer
 Karel Ondříček, Czech violinist
 Miroslav Ondříček, Czech cinematographer

Czech-language surnames
Patronymic surnames
Surnames from given names